VDI may refer to: 

 Verein Deutscher Ingenieure, the Association of German Engineers
 Vidalia Regional Airport (IATA code: VDI)
Vietnam Defence Industry, Vietnam's General Department of Defense Industry.

Technology

 Virtual Desktop Infrastructure, a Citrix/Microsoft desktop virtualization engine
 VDI (file format), the virtual disk image file used in VirtualBox systems
 Virtual Device Interface, a component of Digital Research's Graphics Environment Manager (GEM)